The Runaway Mine Train is a powered steel roller coaster made by MACK Rides of Germany.  The ride is located in the Katanga Canyon area of Alton Towers in Staffordshire, England.

The train normally makes two circuits for each ride, although on quiet days it has been known to run for three or more circuits. The ride runs alongside the Congo River Rapids, with which it shares a tunnel section.  Passengers on the two rides occasionally wave to each other if they pass in the shared tunnel. Passengers must be at least 0.9 m tall to ride with an adult, and over 1.1 m tall to ride separately.

As of 2013, it is officially the park's oldest roller coaster, after The Beastie was removed prior to the 2013 season.

Incidents 
On 20 July 2006, the failure of a coupling on the train caused it to split into two sections, which then collided in the tunnel. 20 people were injured, 6 of whom were taken to a hospital; 4 of the 6 were sent home, and 2 were kept in overnight.

On 6 April 2007, the Runaway Mine Train reopened after being closed for over 8 months. The train was not returned to its full length until the end of June 2007, because some of the carriages were still undergoing refurbishment at MACK Rides.

References

External links
 

Roller coasters in the United Kingdom
Roller coasters operated by Merlin Entertainments
Roller coasters introduced in 1992
Alton Towers
Rides designed by John Wardley